Thorpe Hall may refer to:

 Thorpe Hall (Peterborough), 17th century mansion in Cambridgeshire, England
 Thorpe Hall (Thorpe-le-Soken), former manor and 19th century villa in Essex, England
 Thorpe Hall (Thorpe Salvin), ruins of Grade II* listed 16th century manor house in South Yorkshire, England
 Thorpe Hall School, independent school in Southend-on-Sea, Essex, England
 Thorpe Hall, a Grade II* listed building in Rudston, East Riding of Yorkshire, bequeathed to Godfrey Macdonald, 3rd Baron Macdonald of Sleat and his descendants

See also
Thorpe Constantine Hall, Staffordshire, England

Architectural disambiguation pages